Kelyino is a rural locality (a village) in Sidorovskoye Rural Settlement, Gryazovetsky District, Vologda Oblast, Russia. The population was 7 as of 2002.

Geography 
Kelyino is located 45 km southeast of Gryazovets (the district's administrative centre) by road. Levino is the nearest rural locality.

References 

Rural localities in Gryazovetsky District